J. Walter Michel (born December 30, 1960) is an American politician who has served in the Mississippi State Senate from the 25th district since 2016. He previously served in the Mississippi State Senate from 2000 to 2012.

References

1960 births
Living people
Republican Party members of the Mississippi House of Representatives
Republican Party Mississippi state senators
Politicians from Jackson, Mississippi
21st-century American politicians